Amit Puri (born 28 January 1979) is an Indian chef,  entrepreneur, and cookbook writer..

Amit was born and brought up in Mumbai and was attracted to cooking from his childhood.. He holds a Degree from American Hotel and Motel Association completed his Diploma at VGP Hotel Management Academy, Chennai.

After his training at The Taj Hotel, Mumbai, he got his first job at The Orchid, Mumbai. He has been associated with  National and International brands such as The Coffee Bean & Tea Leaf, LMNO_Q, Refinery 091, Afterlife gastropub, Dubai to name a few.
In 2022, Amit incepted a cloud kitchen named "The Blue Tiffin" as his entrepreneurial venture  in Mumbai which draws inspiration from heritage of India.

Amit is the author of a cookbook, Redefining Comfort food with Chef Amit Puri. He has been featured in the magazines like Femina, Upper Crust India and Architectural Digest.

Bibliography
 Redefining Comfort food with Chef Amit Puri, ASIN:9389058333

References

Indian chefs
Indian food writers
Cookbook writers
Indian businesspeople
1979 births
Living people